Sufna is a 2020 Indian Punjabi-language romantic drama film written and directed by Jagdeep Sidhu. Produced by Panj Paani Films, it stars Ammy Virk and Tania. The film chronicles the story of a young man who fall in love with the cotton picker arrived to his village. Sufna has Jagjeet Sandhu, Jasmin Bajwa and Seema Kaushal in supporting roles; it marked the feature film debut for Tania as a lead actress. The film was released on 14 February 2020 in India. Soundtrack of the film is produced by B Praak and songs are written and composed by Jaani.

Plot 
Teg lives with her father's older brother and Taayi (aunt). Her mother was a Muslim and she died. Her father was part of the army and they say that he is lost. Teg believes that her father is still alive and he will come home. Jeet is a carefree boy. His father committed suicide because he couldn't pay off his debt. Jeet falls in love with Teg when she comes to pick cotton in their village. Teg encourages Jeet to study, so he can become something in life and pay off the debts of his father. When Teg come back to Jeet's village after 13 months, she finds out that Jeet went away for higher studies. She becomes really happy that he listened to her. Jeet comes and meets Teg secretly. Later that year, she tells Jeet that she cannot meet him anymore because she is engaged now and she gives him her mother's jewelry to pay for the expenses of job applications. Jeet tells Kulwinder (who is marrying Teg) that Teg has a bad character to scare him off. But later tells him that he loves her. Teg's fiancé says that he would help them. Instead of helping them, he tells Teg's Taayi that she has been secretly meeting with Jeet. Teg is about to be married, but she runs away to a house she used to work at and hides there in wait for Jeet to come. Jeet comes and finds her unconscious. Later, they come back to her Taayi's house. She tells her uncle that you guys raised me so you have the right to wed me anywhere. Teg confesses that her Taayi may have treated her badly, but she gave her food and roof to live in. Teg says to her aunt that she has found her Phauji (army officer/father [her father was in the army]) and requests her to marry her off with Jeet. Her taayi realises her mistakes and they get her married to Jeet. A couple of months later, Jeet comes back and he is now in the army.

Cast 
 Ammy Virk as Jagjeet
 Tania  as Teg
 Jasmin Bajwa as Tasveer
 Jagjeet Sandhu as Tarsem
 Seema Kaushal as Teg's Taayi
 Kaka Kautki as Gamdoor
 Mohini Toor as Gamdoor's wife
 Lakha Lehri as Teg's Taaya
 Balwinder Bullet as Bagga
 Rabab Kaur as child Teg
 Mintu Kapa as Kulwinder, Teg's fiancé
 Harjinder Singh Sran Tarsem friend
 Karamjit Anmol as special appearance as Kulwinder

Production 
Jagdeep Sidhu started writing the film in July 2019. Sidhu on social media disclosed that the film was inspired from Gurnaam Bhullar's song "Paagal" whereas cotton fields backdrop was inspired from Brazilian film Behind the Sun. Principal photography of the film began on 16 October 2019 and was wrapped on 19 December 2019. Tania visited the village before principal photography began to get into her character. The film marked debut for her as a lead actress. During editing, several scenes from the film were cut down, Sidhu on social media disclosed he missed few deleted scenes.

Soundtrack

Sufnas soundtrack was composed by Indian music producer and singer B Praak; the lyrics were penned by Jaani. The album consists of six songs which were primarily recorded by Praak and Virk, except tracks "Qabool A", which was sung by Hashmat Sultana and "Ammi", which was sung by Kamal Khan. The complete soundtrack was released under the label of Times Music on iTunes on 18 February 2020. The album was also made available for digital download on Google Play in the same month.  Critical response to the music was positive; Manpriya Singh of The Tribune said, "music by B Praak consists of five numbers that lend to the story the warm fuzzy feeling of love and not take away from it [...] the songs, like the script, tug at your heartstrings". Gautam Batra of Koimoi said, "Music is very good and takes the impact of the narrative one level above [...] All the songs are really good but "Ammi", "Jaan Deyan Ge" and "Qabool A" take the cake". The songs "Qabool A" and "Jannat" also peaked on Asian Music chart by Official Charts Company. Upon the film's digital release, "Jannat" entered top 10 in the chart.

Track list

Release 
The film was released on 14 February 2020 on the occasion of Valentine's Day. First song 'Qabool A' from the film was released on 14 January 2020.

Home video 
The film was made available to stream on Amazon Prime Video from 10 April 2020.

Reception

Box office 
Sufna became commercial success upon its release. In its opening weekend, Sufna grossed ₹46.68 lacs in United States, ₹1.94 crore in Canada, ₹38.87 lacs in United Kingdom, ₹37.26 lacs in Australia, and ₹11.44 lacs in New Zealand. After 10 days of its release, the film grossed ₹1.26 crore in United States, ₹5.17 crore in Canada, ₹80.56 lacs in United Kingdom, ₹96.02 lacs in Australia, and ₹25.81 lacs in New Zealand. The film has collected 21.74 Crore Worldwide.

Critical reception 
Manpriya Singh of The Tribune gave three and a half star out of five. Gautam Batra of Koimoi gave four stars out of five. Sukhpreet Kahlon of Cinestaan gave three stars out of four. Gurlove Singh of BookMyShow said "Sufna is the perfect Valentine’s Day gift for your lover that comes with a sweet love story narrated in the simplest manner and portrayed by supremely talented Ammy Virk and Tania".

References

External links 
 

Indian romantic drama films
Punjabi-language Indian films
2020s Punjabi-language films
2020 romantic drama films
Films directed by Jagdeep Sidhu